Mudireddy Mahendar Reddy (born 3 December 1962) is an Indian police Service officer (1986-batch) he was the 2nd and former Director general of police of Telangana since from 10 April 2018. He previously served as the first Police commissioner of Hyderabad after the formation of Telangana.

Early life 
Reddy was born on December 3, 1962, and is a native of Khammam district, Telangana, India.

Education 
M. Mahendar Reddy is a graduate in civil engineering from NIT Warangal (then known as Regional Engineering College), Mr. Reddy got selected for IPS while pursuing M.Tech in Indian Institute of Technology Delhi. He also obtained a master's degree in Public Personnel Management from the Osmania University, when he was in service.

Career 
Reddy served as Assistant SP of Godavarikhani in Karimnagar and Guntur town, Additional SP of Bellampally in Adilabad and SP of Nizamabad and Kurnool districts. He was East zone DCP in Hyderabad commissionerate for three years from 1995. 
Reddy has served as a faculty member at the Sardar Vallabhbhai Patel National Police Academy here and has gone on study tours to the USA and the UK to acquaint himself with police systems in those countries. He was the CP (Commissioner of Police) of Hyderabad City.

References 

1962 births
Living people
Indian police chiefs
People from Khammam district